Temple B'Nai Israel is a former Jewish synagogue at 265 West Main Street in New Britain, Connecticut.  It is a Beaux Arts building originally constructed as a Masonic Hall in 1929, which was listed on the National Register of Historic Places in 1995 under the name "Masonic Temple".

The building is considered architecturally significant as a "fine example" of Neo-Classical Revival style in the Beaux Arts mode.  The building was originally designed by architect Walter P. Crabtree for use as a Masonic hall in 1927. The building was completed in 1929, just before the Great Depression. Financial constraints led the Masons to sell the building to the Aheyu B'Nai Israel in 1940. Some modifications were made to convert it for use as a synagogue, but since both organizations had similar needs (including both office and meeting rooms and a large assembly space), the building readily accommodated the new function. The conversion is considered an example of "an unusual change of use that was carried out successfully".

The architect, Walter Crabtree, also designed the Francis H. Holmes House in New Britain, and the Universalist Church of West Hartford, both also listed on the National Register.

The building is also considered historically significant for its association with New Britain's Jewish community. The congregation of Temple B'Nai Israel was originally an Orthodox congregation, organized in 1889 as Aheyu B'Nai Israel (Brethren Sons of Israel). In 1924 the congregation reorganized as Conservative (under the United Synagogue of America).  Members of the congregation who held to Orthodox views split off, and built Tephereth Israel Synagogue.

The synagogue closed in the summer of 2007. Its Torah scrolls, valued at over tens of thousands of dollars each, were transferred to the Hillel organizations at Trinity College, the University of Hartford, and the University of Connecticut.  As of April, 2020, the building is in use by New Hope at Calvary Church.

See also
National Register of Historic Places listings in Hartford County, Connecticut

References

National Register of Historic Places in Hartford County, Connecticut
Beaux-Arts architecture in Connecticut
Masonic buildings completed in 1929
Buildings and structures in New Britain, Connecticut
Former Masonic buildings in Connecticut
Synagogues on the National Register of Historic Places in Connecticut
Former synagogues in Connecticut
Synagogues completed in 1929
Beaux-Arts synagogues
Neoclassical synagogues